Markham College is an international school in Lima, Peru.  Founded by British immigrants, Markham promotes a mixture of British and Peruvian education. Markham is an independent, non-profit, co-educational, bilingual, secular, day school of approximately 2,000 students aged 3–18. The school has 3 different sections located in Miraflores and Santiago de Surco in Lima.

Its students fulfil the Peruvian national curriculum as well as the IGCSE (International General Certificate of Secondary Education) programme from the University of Cambridge. Many students subsequently enrol in the International Baccalaureate Diploma Programme. All students take English examinations including the Preliminary English Test while in Primary 5 and the First Certificate in English in Secondary 2. Students not pursuing the IB programme take the Certificate in Advanced English in Secondary 5.

Markham has a strong social-service transversal to many of the out-of-class activities, in which help is promoted through collections, manual labour or other activities. From as early as Nursery, Markham students throughout the school help in both national and international service projects.

Students are known as Markhamians, while alumni are identified as Old Markhamians.

History
The school was named after the British historian and explorer Sir Clements Robert Markham (1838–1916).

The first students entered Markham College in March 1946. By 1978, it had grown to about 1,200 students and it was necessary to acquire a second site. The transfer of the Lower School to this site began in 1979. Students enter the school at the age of 3+ and transfer to the Upper School campus at the age of 11+. Currently, there are around 145 students in each year group. Competition for places is fierce and there are very few available spaces in most year groups.

In 1992, the school became co-educational with girls being admitted in roughly equal numbers to boys. In recent years, it has accepted slightly more girls than boys.

In 2004, the school became part of Round Square, an internationally recognised organisation of schools which follows the ideals of Kurt Hahn, and Markhamian delegations have attended Round Square conferences both regionally and globally ever since. The school is also a member of the G20 Schools Group.

Today, more than 2000 pupils attend Markham College representing 34 different countries from around the world.

The House System
Students are nominally divided into four "Houses" which compete in sports, academics and other activities. They are called Cochrane, Guise, Miller and Rowcroft, and named after Lord Cochrane, Vice Admiral Guise, General William Miller (all military figures in Peru's independence war) and Thomas Edward Rowcroft, the first British diplomat in Peru. Their colours are red, blue, green and yellow, respectively. Houses compete in a series of events to obtain the Founder's shield.

The House competition has three major elements: the Swimming Gala, Markham on Stage, and Sports Day. While these are the three most important competitions, during the year students compete regularly in academic, art and sports disciplines including: football, basketball, rugby, cricket, hockey, volleyball, softball, and minisports. Minisports consists of many small disciplines such as archery, shooting, climbing, surfing, table tennis, tennis, badminton, chess, croquet, and others.

Languages
Classes are mostly taught in English, with a small number of courses taught in Spanish. The study of French is compulsory from P3 to S1, becoming optional from S2 onwards.

Subjects offered
At IGCSE level, for courses at secondary three and four, Markham offers classes in Additional Mathematics, Art & Design, Business Studies, Computer Studies, Co-ordinated (double) Science, Design and Technology (three options), Drama, First Language English, Food and Nutrition, French, Geography, History, Information Technology, Literature in both English and Spanish, Mathematics, Music, Physical Education and First and Foreign Language Spanish.

At IB Diploma level, Further Mathematics, Biology, Chemistry, Computer Science, Design Technology, Economics, English A and B, Film Studies, French B, Geography, Global Politics, History, Mathematics, Music, Physics, Psychology, Spanish A and B, Theatre Arts and Visual Arts are currently all being taught at Higher Level. In addition to those, Environmental Systems and Sports, Exercise and Health Science are also available at Standard Level.

No school in this continent and precious few outside it offers the range of subjects that Markham does.
Apart from the academic curriculum, the school offers a variety of extra-curricular activities. These include several art courses, drama, music, sports such as football, hockey, cricket and rugby, and many other activities such as Model United Nations or debating. The full list runs to over 150 options.

Examination results

All students are entered for University of Cambridge ESOL (PET) Preliminary English Test in their final year of Primary education and for the (FCE) First Certificate of English examination at the age of 14. Secondary 5 students who choose to follow the National Programme are entered for the Certificate of Advanced English (CAE). Pass rates are close to 100%.

In 2019, 148 S4 students sat 1497 IGCSE examinations, an average of over 10 per student. The average point score per student (MPS) was 6.07 and 10 students gained 10 or more A*-A grades.

In 2019, the school entered 97 students for the IB Diploma with a choice of study from 41 different subjects and levels. This was both our largest-ever student entry and our largest-ever offering of courses. The average point score of 33.14 is above average for results obtained at the school since the Diploma was introduced and is nearly 5 points above the world average of 28.48. Markham has long held the South American record for the best IB results.

All the examination results are transparent and can be found published on Markham's website.

Uniform
Tradition plays an important part in Markham College, and is represented by the uniforms that the students wear. In the summer months, a white polo shirt with beige shorts or skirts and sneakers is the norm. In winter, students adopt a more formal style of dress which consists of brown shoes, beige trousers or skirts, brown belts, white shirts or blouses, and a brown and gold jumper. There is also a separate P.E. uniform.

Sixth form students are required to wear a formal suit or a blazer in the winter. The use of a tie is not compulsory although it is required during formal activities and events.

HELIX programme
Markham College offers its unique HELIX programme which values all aspects of students' development (and not focus solely on academics); provides opportunities to experiment and apply their learning; gives opportunities to develop their leadership skills; helps develop an awareness of the student's place in the world as well as help them find their passion.

The HELIX programme includes intercultural experiences which encourage the celebration and promotion of the student body's diversity and identity. The Outdoor programme, part of HELIX, promotes students' development through a personal challenge; encourages service to others; and helps develop initiative, leadership and teamwork. The school's broad extracurricular activities are also part of this programme, which is available throughout all three sections of the school (Early Years, Lower School and Upper School).

Notable alumni
Markham College alumni are organised through the Old Markhamian Association (OMA), and include:
 Pedro Pablo Kuczynski Godard -  former President of Peru.
 Alex Fort Brescia - businessman and chairman of Grupo Brescia
 Richard Webb Duarte - former President of the Central Reserve Bank of Peru.
 José Luis Silva Martinot - former Minister of Foreign Commerce and Tourism.
 Miguel Castilla Rubio - former Minister of Economy & Finance and current Peru ambassador to the US.
 Juan Carlos Gamarra Skeels - diplomat and ambassador of Peru to the Holy Seat.
 Jaime Bayly Letts - writer, journalist & television personality.
 Javier Bedoya Denegri - deputy mayor of the San Isidro district.
 Gonzalo Torres- notable actor, comedian, television personality and radio host.
 César Alfredo Miro Quesada Bahamonde - notable novelist and writer.
 Javier Heraud Pérez - notable poet and guerrilla leader.
 Luis Llosa - notable film director and producer.
 Josué Méndez - notable film director.
 Diego Bertie Brignardello - contemporary actor.
 Alonso Alegría Amésquita - notable playwright and theatre actor.
 Alfredo Tomassini - notable football player.
 Felipe Pomar Rospigliosi - First ISF-ISA World Surfing Champion.
 Richard Sinclair Jones Monteverde - notable sailing world champion
 Ramón Ferreyros Pomar - notable rally driver.
 James Berckemeyer Anderson - notable contemporary chef.
 Stefano Peschiera Loret de Mola - First Peruvian sailing Olympian. Participated in the Rio 2016 Summer Olympics.

In popular culture
 In a number of Jaime Bayly's novels, including Yo amo a mi mami and No se lo digas a nadie, the main characters (based on Bayly's experience in the school) attend Markham College.
 Julius, the main character in Alfredo Bryce Echenique's novel A World for Julius, enrols in Markham College after his mother decides to switch him to a British-style school.

References

External links
Official website

International schools in Lima
1946 establishments in Peru
Educational institutions established in 1946
Private schools in Peru
Round Square schools